The 1989 NCAA Division I Men's Tennis Championships were the 43rd annual championships to determine the national champions of NCAA Division I men's singles, doubles, and team collegiate tennis in the United States.

Stanford defeated Georgia, 5–3, in the final of the team championship to win their second consecutive and tenth overall title.

Host site
The tournaments were played at the Dan Magill Tennis Complex at the University of Georgia in Athens, Georgia. The men's and women's tournaments would not be held at the same venue until 2006.

Team championship

See also
1989 NCAA Division I Women's Tennis Championships
NCAA Division II Tennis Championships (Men, Women)
NCAA Division III Tennis Championships (Men, Women)

References

External links
List of NCAA Men's Tennis Champions

NCAA Division I tennis championships
NCAA Division I Men's Tennis Championships
NCAA Division I Men's Tennis Championships
NCAA Division I Men's Tennis Championships